Yerres is a railway station in Yerres, Essonne, Île-de-France, France. It is on Paris RER line D. The station serves the commune of Yerres.

Station Info
At the elevation of 52 meters above sea level, the station is at the 19.064 kilometric point on the Paris-Marseille railway, located between the stations of Montgeron – Crosne and Brunoy. In 2018, the SNCF estimated the annual frequentation of this station at 3,608,729 passengers. This number amounts to 3,713,314 for the year 2017.

Renovations
On 30 September 2013, Transilien announced plans for renovations to the station which would make it accessible to people with disabilities. The station will remain open during construction, which is expected to take about 15 months.

Train services
The following train services serve the station:
Local services (RER D) Goussainville – Saint-Denis – Gare de Lyon – Villeneuve-Saint-Georges – Yerres – Combs-la-Ville–Quincy – Melun
Local services (RER D) Gare de Lyon – Creteil-Pompadour – Villeneuve-Saint-Georges – Yerres – Combs-la-Ville–Quincy – Melun

References

External links

 
 

Railway stations in Essonne
Réseau Express Régional stations